Zsolt Páva (born 30 October 1955) is a Hungarian politician. Páva is a member of Fidesz and mayor of Pécs from 2009 to 2019. He also served as mayor of his hometown between 1994 and 1998.

References

External links
 

Living people
1955 births
People from Pécs
Mayors of places in Hungary
Fidesz politicians